The Mob Doctor is an American television drama that aired on Fox from September 17, 2012, to January 7, 2013, as a part of the 2012–13 network television season. The series was created by Josh Berman and Rob Wright and is based on the book Il Dottore: The Double Life of a Mafia Doctor by Ron Felber. Berman, Wright, Michael Dinner, and Carla Kettner serve as executive producers.

On November 28, 2012, Fox cancelled the series after one season.

Premise
The series follows Grace Devlin, a surgical resident, who juggles her hospital duties with protecting her brother from the Mob. Grace works off her brother's debt by helping anyone they demand.

Cast

Main
 Jordana Spiro as Grace Devlin; well-educated doctor surgical resident who took on her brother's debt to the mob.
 William Forsythe as Constantine Alexander; returned Chicago Outfit boss and Grace's protector.
 James Carpinello as Franco Leoni; Constantine's enforcer and Grace's ex-boyfriend. Undercover FBI agent working to bring down the Chicago mob.
 Zach Gilford as Brett Robinson; Grace's boyfriend to whom she has to lie at times to protect her secrets.
 Željko Ivanek as Stafford White, Chief of Surgical Department; supervises Grace, favors her as a promising surgeon.
 Floriana Lima as Rosa "Ro" Quintero; nurse at the hospital and friend of Grace.
 Jaime Lee Kirchner as Olivia Watson; rival doctor working in the same surgical unit residency as Grace.
 Wendy Makkena as Daniella Devlin, mother of Grace and Nate; she has a history with Constantine.
 Jesse Lee Soffer as Nate Devlin, Grace's brother; owed a debt to mob boss Paul Moretti but his sister took it on for him. Works in Constantine's crew after Moretti is overthrown.

Recurring
 Michael Rapaport as Paul Moretti, former leader of the mob until Constantine takes over.
 David Pasquesi as Ian Fanagan, a senior colleague of Grace's, who Grace frequently disagrees with.
 Kevin J. O'Connor as Stavos Kazan, personal attorney to and consigliere of Constantine's mob family.
 Adam J. Harrington as Owen York, an FBI agent investigating Constantine.
 Shohreh Aghdashloo as Jayana Baylor, a senior doctor at the hospital.
 Kevin Corrigan as Titus Amato, an acquaintance of Constantine and new business partner in the poker machine business.
 Terry Kinney as Donte Amato, brother of Titus, friend of Constantine, and knew Grace's father.
 Jennifer Beals as Celeste LaPree, a madame standing as a proxy for a mob boss in Constantine's underground circle.
 Mike Starr as Al Trapani, a member of Constantine's underground circle.
 Michael Madsen as Russell King, an associate of one of Constantine's former rivals, who attempted to take over Downtown Chicago, before being out-muscled by Constantine.

Production
On May 9, 2012, Fox placed a series order for the drama for the 2012–13 television season.

In production, a working title for the show was Dirty Medicine.

Episodes
{{Episode table |background=#26466D |overall= |title= |director= |writer= |airdate= |viewers= |country=U.S. |episodes=

{{Episode list
 |EpisodeNumber = 1
 |Title         = Pilot 
 |DirectedBy    = Michael Dinner
 |WrittenBy     ={{StoryTeleplay|t= and Television Story by:Josh Berman & Rob Wright}}
 |Viewers       = 5.11
 |OriginalAirDate=
 |ShortSummary   = Grace Devlin is a surgeon who made a deal with Paul Moretti (Michael Rapaport) to save her brother. She agreed to pay off her brother's debt, work it off, or do whatever she was asked to do to save her brother's life, but she did not realize the deal could include murder until Moretti orders her to kill a man in witness protection who requires surgery. With Moretti angrily pursuing her for not killing the man, she flees to Constantine, an old-time paroled 'retired' mobster, who shoots Moretti. Constantine tells her that he was plotting to come out of retirement and take over Moretti's turf and that she needs to leave Chicago because she knows too much. If she stays he'll try to protect her, but her debt to Moretti transfers to him.
 |LineColor     = 26466D
}}

}}

International broadcasts
In Canada, The Mob Doctor was broadcast on Sunday nights at 9:00pm on CTV, premiering on September 16, 2012.
In Mexico, Televisa started showing The Mob Doctor from June 5, 2013, Monday to Thursday at 11:30pm on Canal 5 under the title La Doctora de la Mafia.
In the United Kingdom, Sky Living have obtained first run premiere rights to the first and only season of The Mob Doctor. Originally, the series was billed to air on Tuesday nights at 10:00pm from August 6, 2013. However, the premiere was moved to Friday nights at 10:00pm from August 9, 2013.

Home media
Sony Pictures Home Entertainment released The Mob Doctor - The Complete Series onto DVD on March 12, 2013, on a 3-disc set.

Reception

Critical response
The show has been met with "mixed or average" reviews, with a collective score of 42/100 from Metacritic. Mary McNamara of the Los Angeles Times gave the show a neutral rating, observing that 'Despite the frantic and at times clunky initial execution, there are times when The Mob Doctor shows signs of transcending the typical doc-with-something-extra medical procedural'. Linda Stasi of the New York Post gave the show one and a half stars, saying, "They tried for the tried and true, hoping they'd get The Sopranos meets Grey's Anatomy while filling the hole House left in the schedule. And, like a camel, they ended up with an animal made by committee." David Wiegand of the San Francisco Chronicle gave the show a 0 rating, saying, "The two-taste-treats-in-one thing worked for Hostess Ding-Dongs, so maybe Fox figured it would work for this ding-dong of a dud for the masochists in the crowd".

A few critics, however, had favorable reviews. Glenn Garvin of the Miami Herald praised the concept of the show, saying, "Devlin's complex relationship with the gangsters is what elevates The Mob Doctor into something a cut or two above a Grey's Anatomy rip-off". Diane Werts of Newsday noted that "No, it's not exactly House''. But it isn't like any other show, either, with its mad mix of moral dilemmas, medical crises, family ties, double-life-living and, y'know, rubouts 'n' stuff"

Ratings

References

External links

2012 American television series debuts
2013 American television series endings
2010s American crime drama television series
2010s American medical television series
English-language television shows
Fox Broadcasting Company original programming
Television shows based on books
Television series about organized crime
Television series by Sony Pictures Television
Television shows set in Chicago
Works about the Chicago Outfit